Thira is a 2013 Indian Malayalam-language mystery-thriller drama film directed by Vineeth Sreenivasan and scripted by his cousin Rakesh Mantodi. It stars Shobana alongside debutant Dhyan Sreenivasan in the lead roles. The film was produced by Manoj Menon under the banner ReelsMagic and distributed by LJ Films. 

Thira was announced to be the first installment in a trilogy of thriller films.  According to Srinivasan, the film was inspired from the book The Road of Lost Innocence: The True Story of a Cambodian Heroine by Somaly Mam. The film marks the debut of Vineeth Sreenivasan's younger brother Dhyan Sreenivasan and also the return of Shobana Pillai to Malayalam cinema after almost a gap of five years. It was filmed by Jomon T. John and has music composed by Shaan Rahman. Principal photography of the film took place in Hyderabad, Chennai, Belgaum and Goa. It was released on 14 November 2013 to moderate reviews, despite failing poorly at the box office. The film was screened in IFFK 2013. Dinesh Prabhakar was the casting director for the movie and it's the first movie that introduced the concept of casting director in Malayalam movie.

Synopsis
The story is set in the Indian states of Karnataka and Goa. Dr. Rohini Pranab, a busy cardiac surgeon, also rescues and shelters destitute and trafficked girls in a home she runs. One day, her girls are kidnapped by an illegal human trafficking ring. Rohini is charged with illegal trafficking after the kidnap of the girls and the news hits all major newspapers. A youth named Naveen also loses his sister to the same gang when she is kidnapped, right in front of his eyes. Rohini and  Naveen meet due to similar circumstances and decide to rescue the girls before they are drugged and raped by high-profile clients during a party organised by a mining group. Rohini's friends also try to help, but the gang is well connected, well coordinated and a step ahead of them always.

By opening the bank locker of Pranab Ray, Rohini's husband, an investigative journalist who was killed by this very same gang, they get clues to the whereabouts of the girls, but his hard disk with the information is stolen when Rohini is kidnapped while coming out of the bank. Rohini escapes from the kidnappers car who drive away with Pranab's file and hard disk. Rohini remembers the photograph in Pranab's file and they figure out the place where the girls are. They then proceed to Goa to rescue the girls.

Cast
 Shobana as Dr. Rohini Pranab
 Dhyan Sreenivasan as Naveen
 S. Rajasekar as Dada
 Sijoy Varghese as Cabinet Minister Alex
 Deepak Parambol as Deepak
 Gaurav Vasudev as Kidnapper
 Amritha Anil as Rhea
 Harikrishnan
 Sabhitha
 Janan V Jacob as Bank Manager

Soundtrack

The film's soundtrack is composed by Shaan Rahman. Lyrics are penned by Anu Elizabeth Jose.

Critical reception
Thira received average reviews upon releasing and was generally considered a box-office flop. The movie did not have a large reception mainly because the film got only a few releases and the telecasting of the movie wasn't widespread. The movie is deemed as "an underrated brilliance of Vineeth Sreenivasan".

Nowrunning.com remarked that "Vineeth Sreenivasan's Thira is a thoughtful exploration of a theme that is often discussed in hushed whispers. It's quite resolute in its objective, is extremely detailed, is involving for its most part and is charmingly acted as well." Oneindia.in rated it 4 out of 5 and says "Here comes a movie which stands apart from the rest of Malayalam films, which entertains the viewers from start to end and makes us crave for more. Yes, Thira by Vineeth Sreenivasan is a well directed, well acted, engaging movie which can be termed as paisa vasool." The Times of India gave 3 stars out of 5 and mentioned "The narrative of the film moves at a steady pace despite the predictability that comes along with it". Sify.com described the film as average, "an okay one-time watch", while pointing out inspirations from the 2007 film, Trade. The New Indian Express wrote, "Thira is a satisfying thriller carried successfully by lead actress Shobhana".

Sequel 
Thira was announced to be the first of the trilogy thriller series by Vineeth Sreenivasan. Vineeth wrote on his official blog, "Thira is not one film. It's a trilogy. If everything goes well by god's grace, Part 1 will be releasing in 2013. Part 2 and Part 3 will follow....". Vineeth also revealed that Thira 2 will have a popular young actor of Mollywood in lead role and he will also star in Thira 3, along with Shobana, who played the lead in Thira. 
The sequel was planned to be more character oriented, rather than being an extension of Thira. It was confirmed by Vineeth that Thira 2 will be focusing more on the character, Amar and the part of Dhyan is over with the first film.
However, Vineeth confirmed that the sequel didn't materialize due to several reasons.

Festival screenings
The film was an official selection for the following film festivals:
 Gwinnett Center International Film Festival  – International Competition section.

Awards
Vanitha Film Awards
Best Actress – Shobana Pillai

Asianet Film Awards
Best Debut Actor – Dhyan Sreenivasan

References

External links
 
 Thira – Official Facebook Page

2013 films
2010s Malayalam-language films
Films scored by Shaan Rahman
2013 thriller films
Films about prostitution in India
Indian mystery thriller films
Films shot in Karnataka
Films shot in Goa
Films shot in Telangana
Films shot in Chennai
Indian mystery drama films
Films directed by Vineeth Sreenivasan